Patricia Paz Maria Medina (19 July 1919 – 28 April 2012) was a British actress. She is perhaps best known for her roles in the films Phantom of the Rue Morgue (1954) and Mr. Arkadin (1955).

Early life
Medina was the daughter of Laureano Ramón Medina Nebot, a Spanish lawyer and opera singer from the Canary Islands, and an English mother, Edith May Strode. Patricia had two sisters, Piti (Pepita) and Gloria. Born in Liverpool,  her sisters and she grew up at a mansion in Stanmore. Medina began acting as a teenager in the late 1930s, and worked her way up to leading roles in the mid-1940s, when she left London for Hollywood.

Career
In 1950's Fortunes of Captain Blood, she teamed with British actor Louis Hayward. They subsequently appeared together in 1951's The Lady and the Bandit, Lady in the Iron Mask, and Captain Pirate from 1952.

Darkly beautiful, Medina was often typecast in period melodramas such as The Black Knight. Two of her more notable films were William Witney's Stranger at My Door and Orson Welles' Mr. Arkadin, based on episodes of the radio series The Adventures of Harry Lime, itself derived from The Third Man film.

Although prolific during the early 1950s, her film career faded by the end of the decade. In 1958, she performed in four episodes as Margarita Cortazar on Walt Disney's ABC series, Zorro. In 1958, she also appeared as "The Lady" Diana Coulter in Richard Boone's CBS Western series, Have Gun, Will Travel. She was then cast in an episode of Darren McGavin's NBC Western series, Riverboat. In 1960, she was cast as different characters in two episodes ("Fair Game" and "The Earl of Durango") of the ABC Western series, The Rebel. Medina also made television appearances on Perry Mason ("The Case of the Lucky Loser", 27 September 1958); Bonanza ("The Spanish Grant", 6 February 1960), Thriller ("The Premature Burial", 1961), The Alfred Hitchcock Hour ("See the Monkey Dance", 9 November 1964) and The Man from U.N.C.L.E ("The Foxes and Hounds Affair", 8 October 1965). 

Medina guest starred as Ruthanne Harper in "Incident of the Boomerang" in 1961 and Ilona Calvin in "Incident at Jacob's Well" in 1959, on Rawhide. She guest-starred in the Branded episode "Yellow for Courage" in 1966 and the Burke's Law (Gene Barry as Amos Burke) TV episode "Don Pablo" in 1967.

In 1968, she returned to the big screen in The Killing of Sister George, Robert Aldrich's adaptation of the lesbian-themed drama of the same name.

Medina and her husband, American actor Joseph Cotten, toured together in several plays and on Broadway in the murder mystery Calculated Risk.

Autobiography
In 1998, she published an autobiography, Laid Back in Hollywood.

Personal life
Medina married British actor Richard Greene on 24 December 1941, in St. James's Church, Spanish Place, London; they divorced in 1951. Medina married Joseph Cotten on 20 October 1960, in Beverly Hills at the home of David O. Selznick and Jennifer Jones. Cotten and she bought a historic 1935 home in the Mesa neighborhood of Palm Springs, California, where they lived from 1985 to 1992. No children were born from either marriage.

Death
Medina died at age 92 on 28 April 2012, from natural causes at the Barlow Respiratory Hospital in Los Angeles, California.

She was interred at Blandford Cemetery in Petersburg, Virginia, beside the remains of her husband, Cotten.

Complete filmography

 Dinner at the Ritz (1937) – (uncredited)
 Mr. Satan (1938) – A Girl
 Simply Terrific (1938) – Heather Carfax
 Double or Quits (1938) – Caroline
 This Man Is News (1938) – Waitress in teashop (uncredited)
 Crook's Tour (1941) – Hotel Receptionist (uncredited)
 The Day Will Dawn (1942) – Ingrid
 The First of the Few (1942) – Venetian Girl (uncredited)
 They Met in the Dark (1943) – Mary – Manicurist
 Hotel Reserve (1944) – Odette Roux
 Don't Take It to Heart (1944) – Mary
 Kiss the Bride Goodbye (1945) – Joan Dodd
 Waltz Time (1945) – Cenci Prohaska
 The Secret Heart (1946) – Kay Burns; first American role
 The Beginning or the End (1947) – Mrs. Wyatt (uncredited)
 Moss Rose (1947) – Audrey Ashton
 The Foxes of Harrow (1947) – Desiree
 The Three Musketeers (1948) – Kitty
 The Fighting O'Flynn (1949, opposite then husband, Richard Greene) – Fancy Free
 Children of Chance (1949) – Agostina
 Francis (1950) – Maureen Gelder
 Fortunes of Captain Blood (1950) – Isabelita Sotomayor
 Abbott and Costello in the Foreign Legion (1950) – Nicole Dupre
 The Jackpot (1950) – Hildegarde Jonet / Hilda Jones
 Valentino (1951) – Lila Reyes
 The Lady and the Bandit (1951) – Joyce Greene
 The Magic Carpet (1951) – Lida
 Aladdin and His Lamp (1952) – Princess Jasmine
 Lady in the Iron Mask (1952) – Princess Anne / Princess Louise
 Captain Pirate (1952) – Dona Isabella
 Desperate Search (1952) – Nora Stead
 Botany Bay (1952) – Sally Munroe
 Siren of Bagdad (1953) – Princess Zendi
 Sangaree (1953) – Martha Darby
 Plunder of the Sun (1953) – Anna Luz
 Phantom of the Rue Morgue (1954) – Jeanette
 Drums of Tahiti (1954) – Wanda Spence
 The Black Knight (1954) – Linet
 Pirates of Tripoli (1955) – Princess Karjan
 Mr. Arkadin (1955) – Mily
 Duel on the Mississippi (1955) – Lili Scarlet
 The Red Cloak (1955) – Laura Lanfranchi
 Uranium Boom (1956) – Jean Williams
 Stranger at My Door (1956) – Peg Jarret
 The Beast of Hollow Mountain (1956) – Sarita
 Miami Exposé (1956) – Lila Hodges
 The Buckskin Lady (1957) – Angela Medley
 Battle of the V-1 (1958) – Zofia
 Count Your Blessings (1959) – Albertine
 Snow White and the Three Stooges (1961) – Queen / Witch / Gypsy Matilda
 The Killing of Sister George (1968) – Betty Thaxter
 Latitude Zero (1969) – Lucretia
 Keene (1969)
 Timber Tramps (1975) – Miami Lills
 El llanto de los pobres (1978) – (final film role)

Selected television roles
 Tales of the 77th Bengal Lancers (1956)
 Zorro (1957)
 The Californians in episode "Lola Montez" (NBC-TV, 1958) – Lola Montez
 Perry Mason (1957 TV series) in “The Case of the Lucky Loser” (1958) – Harriet Belfour
 Rawhide (CBS-TV, 1960)
 Bonanza (1960) – Isabella Maria Ynez Y Castro De La Cuesta / Rosita Morales in the episode The Spanish Grant
 Thriller (NBC-TV, 1961; 2 episodes) – Victorine Lafourcade / Nadja
 Have Gun – Will Travel (1957–1963) – Diana Coulter / Sabina – Unforgiving Minute / 
 The Alfred Hitchcock Hour (1964) – Wife
 The Man from U.N.C.L.E. (1965) – Lucia Belmont
 Branded (NBC-TV, 1966) – Dr. Karen L. Miller

References

External links

 
 
 
 
 Photograph

1919 births
2012 deaths
Actresses from Liverpool
Actresses from Los Angeles
Actresses from Palm Springs, California
British expatriate actresses in the United States
British film actresses
British stage actresses
British television actresses
British people of Spanish descent
Burials at Blandford Cemetery
English people of Canarian descent
20th-century English actresses
21st-century American women